Colorado's 21st Senate district is one of 35 districts in the Colorado Senate. It has been represented by Democrat Dominick Moreno since 2017, succeeding fellow Democrat Jessie Ulibarri.

Geography
District 21 covers the immediate northern suburbs of Denver in Adams County, including Commerce City, Federal Heights, Berkley, Derby, Sherrelwood, Twin Lakes, Welby, parts of Shaw Heights and Westminster, and the eastern tip of Arvada.

The district is located entirely within Colorado's 7th congressional district, and overlaps with the 30th, 31st, 32nd, 34th, and 35th districts of the Colorado House of Representatives.

Recent election results
Colorado state senators are elected to staggered four-year terms; under normal circumstances, the 21st district holds elections in presidential years.

2020

2016

2012

Federal and statewide results in District 21

References 

21
Adams County, Colorado